The Cerro del Obispado (Spanish for Bishopric Hill) is a famous landmark in the city of Monterrey, Mexico, named after the building constructed in the middle of the slope by the end of the 18th century.

The hill is a popular recreational area that includes a public lookout point (Mirador del Obispado), a monumental flag, and the famous Bishopric Palace (Palacio del Obispado).

See also
Mirador del Obispado
Cerro de la Silla
Famous places in Monterrey

Landmarks in Monterrey
Geography of Nuevo León
Tourist attractions in Monterrey